Sky Entertainment was a television channel owned by British Sky Broadcasting which was broadcast to the Scandinavian countries, lasting about 18 months.

The channel was the result of an agreement between Telenor CTV and British Sky Broadcasting made in March 1997, which meant Telenor would be able to broadcast two channels produced by BSkyB to their subscribers in Scandinavia.

History

Pre-launch 

On December 13, 1995, British satellite TV provider British Sky Broadcasting and major ITV region franchisee Granada Television announced its new joint-venture entitled as Granada Sky Broadcasting, its channels will made use of Granada's programming library combined with Sky's assistance in technical, managing, marketing and financial situations, a total of eight new channels had been planned and to be launched on the Sky Multichannels pay-TV package.

Early years 

Following the successful launch of the GSkyB channels in the British and Irish market, the Granada Television and British Sky Broadcasting's joint-venture wanted to expand into new markets, and they decided that Scandinavia should be the market that they were looking for. British TV programming in Sweden and other Scandinavian countries be likely to be popular and watched alongside American TV shows as well as their own native programming, the English language is a second language to many, or most Scandinavians. On March 10, 1997, Telenor announced 2 new channels from Sky that they will joining their CTV satellite service in autumn of that year, thus these channels included The Sky News & Documentaries Channel and The Sky Family Entertainment Channel, both of which were distributed via Telenor's Thor 1 satellite (at one degree west), The Sky Family Entertainment Channel (or shortened as Sky Entertainment) was originally going to be an GSkyB channel, while the Sky News & Documentaries Channel wholly owned by Sky. The Sky Family Entertainment Channel was originally intended to be an selection of content available from BSkyB's satellite TV service in the UK and Ireland, it might be most likely that Granada's channels were chosen as there will be no territorial broadcast rights issues.

On September 15, 1997, both Sky Entertainment, along with Sky News & Documentaries launched on Telenor's CTV satellite service in Scandinavia, it was the first time that a Sky-operated channel broadcast in Scandinavia since Sky's TV channel were encrypted (for paying customers in the British and Irish markets only) in September 1993, with only a exception to Sky News, which was free-to-air and can be received on Astra. Both channels was available up to 225,000 CTV subscribers, plus for cable subscribers. 

Both Sky Entertainment and Sky News & Documentaries were in fact, combinations of channels, with Sky News & Documentaries consisted of Sky News airing from 02:00 to 18:00 CET, while The Computer Channel airing from 18:00 to 20:00 CET, and National Geographic Channel airing from 20:00 to 02:00 CET. Sky Entertainment also had three Granada channels and one, which were different from these Granada channels airing between the 24-hour day. In Sky Entertainment's case, the channels were:

At the time during the launch, Sky Entertainment shared its analogue D2-MAC transponder on Intelsat 707 with Danish public service broadcaster DR2, meaning that CMT and Granada Good Life were the only channels broadcasting to analogue viewers, meanwhile, DR2 was broadcasting between 5 p.m. and 1 a.m., meaning the programmes of Granada Plus and/or Granada Men & Motors weren't available to analogue viewers.

The channels were broadcast on the 1 degree west frequency as a part of the CTV package.

When CMT Europe closed down in 1998, it's airtime on Sky Entertainment was replaced by Video Zone.

On February 14, 1999, Sky Entertainment will be ceasing transmissions at 1am CET, after just 18 months on-air. Bosses had a meeting in London on the channel's final days to decide which is the channel fate and who is gonna replace it, also an alternative Sky service will be considered, but these never happened. However, Sky News and the National Geographic Channel continued to be broadcast in Scandinavia till this day, but as separate channels.

References 

Pan-Nordic television channels
Television channels and stations established in 1997
Television channels and stations disestablished in 1999
Defunct television channels in Sweden
Defunct television channels in Norway
Defunct television channels in Denmark
Defunct television channels in Finland